is an Italian-Japanese anime series produced by Tatsunoko Productions and Mondo TV, based on the 1812 European fairy tale. Directed by Kunitoshi Okajima, the series premiered on NHK on 6 April 1994 and ran for 52-episodes until its conclusion on 29 March 1995.

The series uses two pieces of theme music: one opening theme, "Heart no mori e tsuretette" by Miki Sakai with Red Dolphins, and one ending theme,  by Mebae Miyahara. The original score was written by video game composer Hiroki Kikuta.

Plot
The story starts with the birth of a beautiful princess whose skin was as white as snow, hair like ebony and lips like the red color of the roses. Her parents, King and Queen of the Emerald Valley, name her Snow White. The little girl grows happy and healthy, and when her fourth birthday arrives, her parents give her three delightful pets for her presents: a puppy, a cat and a dove.

Soon, Queen Isabelle falls ill and dies, after which Lady Chrystal takes her place, who turns out to be not only an evil, selfish, ambitious woman, she also indulges in the black art of sorcery.

After the king's departure, she makes life difficult for Snow White, although Prince Richard did a bit to liven up the life of the young princess. Later, when the evil Queen makes an attempt to kill Snow White due to her famed beauty, the little girl ends up in a cosy little cottage, house to seven dwarfs who eventually befriend her and conjure to protect her from all harms inflicted by her stepmother.

Queen Chrystal tried to take the life of Snow White several times: once by a poisoned ribbon, another time with an enchanted comb, times at which the dwarfs saved her with help from their Book of Knowledge. But during the Queen's last attempt, she finally succeeds to put her in an enchanted sleep - by means of a poisoned apple - in order to take over her body, for hers is aging rapidly due to use of sorcery against a pure soul.

Main characters

King Conrad
King of the Emerald Valley, he is heart-broken when his beloved queen passes away, but agrees to fulfill her last wish so that his young daughter, Snow White, can be brought up and educated by a mother.

Queen Isabelle
First Queen consort of Emerald Valley and wife to King Conrad, she dies when her daughter, Snow White, is only four years old. Her dying wish is for her little girl to be raised up by a new mother.

Molly
Queen Isabelle's personal maid and head over all castle staff, Molly takes care of Snow White; until an unfortunate event occurs and she is banished from the castle.

Snow White
Voiced by Yuri Amano.

A young and beautiful girl, Snow White lives happy; until war breaks out in the kingdom and her father is forced to leave her in the care of her then-loving step-mother. Not long time would come to pass until her step-mother would force her away from the castle.

Lady/Queen Chrystal
Voiced by Mari Yokoo.

Ruling over a small neighbouring kingdom, she comes to the Emerald Valley in order to marry King Conrad and to raise his daughter, the young Snow White. She is famed for her beauty, which she desperately worships above anything else and she would stop at nothing to rest the fairest woman in the land.

Speck, Spirit of the Mirror
Speck's origins are unknown at the beginning, just as those of the object inside which he resides, reflecting the truth. Through enchantments he is able to respond to whoever calls him from the mortal world and is obliged to answer truthfully.

Prince Richard
Voiced by Takehito Koyasu.

The son of King of Albertville, a close ally of Conrad, he falls in love with princess Snow White, but is soon called to join his father in battle. Torn from his beloved not only by his unknowing father but also by the jealous Queen, he fights to find the whereabouts of the princess and to restore her rank.

Samson
The court huntsman and direct subject to the sovereign and, that is, the Queen, he is obliged to take the heart of the young princess back to Chrystal, but, before he could decide not to do the deed, he saves Snow White from a ravaging black bear and tells her what her stepmothers’ plans are and advises her to go into hiding. Afterwards he himself retires to the countryside and occasionally comes across Snow White and her friends and helps them with their matters at hand.

Boss
Voiced by Hiroshi Naka.

The chief of the dwarf coven and the eldest and wisest of them all, he bears the staff which shows his rank. He is meditative but when necessary he can be harsh and speak in accordance with his function. He consults the Book of Knowledge when needed, as in the case of the young princess' arrival to their cottage.

Gourmet/Gurume
Voiced by Junichi Sugawara.

The dwarf who is at all times responsible with the food, he takes Snow White in right away and when she fails to take over his responsibilities, he is willing to teach her how to cook and clean the house.

Woody
Voiced by Nobuyuki Furuta.

The one who takes care of the hardcore chores, Woody is a fine wood chopper and is the most reluctant to take Snow White in. Sensible on the inside though, he is the last to agree with her staying, but the first one to give her a gift and by doing so, setting the other dwarfs off to do the same.

Goldie/Goldy
Voiced by Kôzô Shioya.

Although Goldie's strength and wish for labor might make him look rough around the edges, he is a caring and loving dwarf, who at one point even desires to exchange his life for Snow White's.

Chamomile
Voiced by Katsume Suzuki.

A Clam and shy dwarf, Chamomile is the coven's expert in herbs, mushrooms or any other sort of plant, being able to prepare powerful sleeping draughts or transformation potions, so that one can disguise and venture for a few hours into the world of humans.

Vet/Pet
Voiced by Wataru Takagi.

Vet is a very caring dwarf, but also very fearful and is quiet, as he takes great care of animals. Beneath this particular trait, however, lies another, bravery, which comes to the surface when one of his most precious friends is in grave danger. He mans every activity around the house which involves the pets, two goats, one lamb and a chicken.

Jolly
Voiced by Tetsuya Iwanaga.

Even though Jolly is 50 years old, he is the youngest of the dwarfs and is considered to be the most inexperienced. But beneath his stubbornness and childlike appearance lies a true heart, capable of doing anything to defend Snow White (as he likes him from the first time he sees her) even argue with his co-inhabitants to let her stay and is accompanying her almost all the time.

Poppie/Pokke
Voiced by Akiko Hiramatsu.

Poppie is born out of the egg Jolly finds and is brought up by the latter, helped by Snow White. He helps the little dwarf community when the Evil Queen Chrystal turns her wrath onto the forest.

Gobby
Gobby, Prince over the Goblin Kingdom, develops an affection towards Snow White's beauty and desires to take her as his wife by force. That is, of course, until Jolly decides to confront him.

Memole
Close friend and advisor to Gobby, Memole is secretly in love with him and decides to help Snow White escape from the unwanted marriage.

Mylfee
A little fairy that Snow White and Jolly encounter along the way, Mylfee can control the wind...or not. Everything she tries to do ends up with a catastrophe until a small being helps her overcome this.

Mylarka, the Sage from the Sword
Little is known of Mylarka’s past, except for the fact that a disaster had occurred which tore her from her realm and into the mortal world. Mylarka and her beloved were imprisoned by an evil witch in a mirror and a sword respectively, none of them knowing the location of the other, so that they would be unable communicate. That was until the step-daughter of the evil witch made her way to the cave in which Mylarka's Sword lies in stone.

Jack
A "mocking boy" as he is referenced to, Jack is a young man who at first dislikes Snow White and mocks her appearance, but he ends up falling in love with her. We find out very late in the series that he is a Genie of the Forests, when the Queen summons him and asks him to do her bidding.

Episodes
 "A Princess is Born"
 "The Stepmother"
 "Prince Richard"
 "Time to say Goodbye"
 "The Heart of a Princess"
 "The Seven Dwarves"
 "A New Family"
 "The Magic Flowers"
 "Reunion beneath the Stars"
 "Richard's Letter"
 "Adventure at the Castle"
 "A Difficult Task"
 "A Blue-Green Devil"
 "The Book of Life"
 "Seven Colors of the Rainbow"
 "The Butterflies"
 "The White Rabbit"
 "In the Realm of Ice"
 "A New Friend"
 "Proof"
 "The Initiatory Journey"
 "A Strange Egg"
 "The Legendary Mountain"
 "The Small Pixie"
 "Voices from the Past"
 "Eternal Love"
 "A Nice Surprise"
 "An Adorable Girl"
 "A Mocking Boy"
 "In Search of the Flower of Hope"
 "Mary's Gift"
 "Snow White's Awakening"
 "The Evil Fog"
 "When the Evil genie is at large"
 "The Pendant of Love"
 "The Miracle"
 "The Departure"
 "An Unexpected Encounter"
 "Hope Springs"
 "The Queen's Summoning"
 "The Bouquet of Flowers"
 "A World of Illusions"
 "Tears of a Princess"
 "A Brave Prince"
 "Prayer to the Moon"
 "The Mirror's Secret"
 "Jonas the Magician"
 "The Force of Earth"
 "A Kingdom of Stone"
 "The Poisoned Apple"
 "The Blue Eagle"
 "The Kiss"

References

1994 anime television series debuts
Anime and manga based on fairy tales
Fantasy anime and manga
NHK original programming
Tatsunoko Production
Works based on Snow White
Italian children's animated fantasy television series
Japanese children's animated fantasy television series